Emdrup station is a commuter train station on the Farum radial of the S-train network in Copenhagen, Denmark. Local landmarks include Aarhus University's Copenhagen campus and Emdrup Lake.

History
The station was not one of the original stations on the Slangerup Station. The station opened on 20 April 1906. The station building was one of the smallest on the rail line and of the same type as the one on Hareskov Station. At the time of its opening, it was still surrounded by open farm land. The station only attracted few passengers due to competition from the tram lines to nearby Bispebjerg but was of more importance as a freight station due to a lumberyard at the site. The station was closed on 31 March but reopened as an S-train station on 25 September 1977.

See also
 List of railway stations in Denmark

References

External links

S-train (Copenhagen) stations
Railway stations in Denmark opened in the 20th century

1906 establishments in Denmark
Railway stations opened in 1906